Sharon Rina Lopatka (September 20, 1961 – October 16, 1996) was an Internet entrepreneur in Hampstead, Maryland, United States who was killed in a case of apparent consensual homicide. Lopatka was tortured and strangled to death on October 16, 1996, by Robert "Bobby" Frederick Glass, a computer analyst from North Carolina. The apparent purpose was mutual sexual gratification.  The case was reportedly the first where a police department arrested a murder suspect with evidence gathered primarily from email messages. While Lopatka and Glass had initially planned a consensual homicide, Glass maintained that the death was an accident, which was corroborated by Lopatka's autopsy. However, police contended the death was intentional.

Background
Sharon Lopatka was the first of four daughters born to Orthodox Jewish parents Mr. and Mrs. Abraham J. Denburg. They were members of the Beth Tfiloh Congregation, Abraham being a cantor at the synagogue. Raised in Baltimore, Maryland, Sharon was allegedly considered by her classmates "as normal as you can get", wrote The News & Observer, and was a part of sport teams and her school's choir club. Graduating from Pikesville High School in 1979, Lopatka married construction worker Victor Lopatka in Ellicott City, Maryland, in 1991, and relocated with him to a ranch-esque tract house in Hampstead, Maryland, during the early 1990s. The marriage was described by a classmate of Lopatka as a "way of breaking away", and her parents did not approve of it.

In 1995, Lopatka started doing online advertising businesses from her Ellicott City home in order to make additional money. The first website she hosted, "House of Dion", was for selling home decor guides by mail for seven dollars. An advertisement on the website read, "Home decorating secrets seen in the posh homes from the New England states to the Hollywood homes can now be yours. Never published before! Quick easy ways to decorate your home."

She was paid $50 per advertisement rewriting ad copy her business titled "Classified Concepts". She managed several websites for distributing psychic readings, also garnering a percentage of the money from sales of other services with premium-rate telephone numbers advertised on her websites.

In addition to her advertising and psychic reading business, Lopatka marketed pornographic content, using the alias Nancy Carlson, which depicted women who were unconscious from being drugged, hypnotized or chloroformed engaging in sex acts with each other. She sold her undergarments, an advertisement for them reading, "Is there anyone out there interested in buying my worn panties..." She also used the Internet to fulfill her own sexual desires that were often considered irregular to society. Lopatka used other pseudonyms and personas when using pornographic chat rooms of sites like fetishfeet.com and sexbondage.com that had members with fetishes such as necrophilia, bondage and sadomasochism. More than 50 messages that showed her sexual desire of being tortured to death were discovered by The News & Observer. Lopatka's character of Carlson, who was a disciplinarian dominatrix pornographic movie actress who weighed 300 pounds, was one of the pseudonyms she used for the chats. This alarmed a sex workers' rights activist named Tanith who tried to stop Lopatka's behavior. Lopatka replied to Tanith that "I want the real thing. I did not ask for you preaching to me."

Robert "Bobby" Frederick Glass worked as a computer analyst for the government of Catawba County, North Carolina, for nearly 16 years. His tasks included programming tax rolls and keeping track of the amount of vehicle gas consumption in the county. For 14 years until May 1996, Glass was married to his wife Sherri, and the couple had two daughters and one son. Later during the marriage, Sherri noticed her husband was spending much more time on the computer than with her. Wary, she logged on to his email account and found several "raw, violent and disturbing" messages that he sent using the pseudonyms Toyman and Slowhand. As a result, the two separated. Lopatka first met Glass in August 1996 while in a pornographic chat room. Through email, Lopatka presented her fetish of being tortured to Glass, while he sent messages about how he would fulfill her fantasy. Close to 900 pages of emails between the two were discovered by police during the investigation of Lopatka's death.

Killing and investigation
On the morning of October 13, 1996, Lopatka informed her husband she was going to Georgia to meet acquaintances. She also left him a note that she would not be returning home and requested not to track down Glass. The note also read, "If my body is never retrieved, don't worry: know that I'm at peace." That morning, Lopatka drove her blue Honda Civic to Baltimore's Pennsylvania Station (a 45-minute drive) and had arrived on an Amtrak train at Charlotte, North Carolina, by 8:45 p.m. Glass drove with Lopatka in his pickup truck to his rural Lenoir, North Carolina mobile home, 80 miles from Charlotte.

Lopatka's husband Victor found the note his wife left for him and notified the police, who found six weeks of email conversations between Lopatka and Glass. In her email correspondence with Glass, Lopatka had explicitly asked Glass to torture her to death.

Glass, interviewed later during his imprisonment, admitted to fulfilling Lopatka's torture fantasy, but also said that the death was an accident. As he recalled, "I don't know how much I pulled the rope ... I never wanted to kill her, but she ended up dead." This was corroborated by the autopsy performed by John Butts, the chief state medical examiner of North Carolina, who stated that Lopatka was accidentally strangled to death three days after her arrival in North Carolina. However, the police disagreed: their search warrant affidavits described the death as intentional, and that the emails proved it.

North Carolina police staked out Glass's home for several days, but did not see Lopatka. On October 25, 1996, Judge Beverly T. Beal issued a search warrant on the home, and inside the house, investigators discovered items belonging to Lopatka. In addition, they also found drug and bondage equipment, magazines containing child sexual exploitation material, a .357 Magnum pistol, and several computer disks, as well as trash and toys outside the trailer. A police officer then noticed a mound of soil 75 feet away from the home, before finding some bodyparts buried two and a half feet below. Glass was arrested at work following this discovery, charged with first-degree murder, and held without bond in the Caldwell County Jail. Glass also faced additional state and federal charges for the possession of child sexual exploitation material. County investigator D. A. Brown said that Lopatka's body might have never been found had it been buried in the woods behind Glass's house.

Glass pleaded guilty to voluntary manslaughter and sexual exploitation charges on January 27, 2000, and was sentenced to 36–53 months in the Avery-Mitchell Correctional Institution. He was also sentenced to an additional 27 months for federal charges of second-degree minor exploitation, to be served consecutively.

Glass was found dead of a heart attack in prison on February 20, 2002, one month before he was to finish his state sentence and begin his federal sentence.

Influence
The Lopatka case was reportedly the first where a murder suspect was put in custody by the police department mainly due to evidence from emails. A majority of the media coverage of Lopatka's killing mainly emphasized the potentially dangerous consequences of Internet meetings. Several people requested that a type of censorship be created to better protect humans from killings like that of Lopatka's, while anti-censorship activists counter-argued that people could better express controversial beliefs in an open forum without the need of a real identity. Writers have labeled the situation as one of the earliest examples of what psychologists called Mardi Gras phenomenon, where one uses a variety of personalities to decrease their chances of having a consequence for their actions. Thanks to the popularity of the case, more psychologists increased their desire to have a better understanding of atypical sexual desires caused by sadism, masochism and asphyxia.

Cultural references
The case inspired a 2008 movie, Downloading Nancy, which premiered at Sundance Film Festival and had a wider release during 2009. Interviews with screenwriter Lee Ross indicate he was aware of the Lopatka case and found it "dark, horrible ... and intriguing".

See also

Autassassinophilia
Crime in Maryland
Crime in North Carolina
Internet suicide
Internet homicide
Armin Meiwes

References

Bibliography 

1996 murders in the United States
Deaths by person in Maryland
Deaths by strangulation in the United States
1996 in Maryland
Incidents of violence against women
1996 in North Carolina
Necrophilia
BDSM
Bondage (BDSM)
Cybercrime